Mari-Turek (Marij Türek) is an urban locality (an urban-type settlement) and the administrative center of Mari-Tureksky District of the Mari El Republic, Russia. As of the 2010 Census, its population was 5,164.

Administrative and municipal status
Within the framework of administrative divisions, Mari-Turek serves as the administrative center of Mari-Tureksky District. As an administrative division, the urban-type settlement of Mari-Turek, together with twenty-nine rural localities, is incorporated within Mari-Tureksky District as Mari-Turek Urban-Type Settlement (an administrative division of the district). As a municipal division, Mari-Turek Urban-Type Settlement is incorporated within Mari-Tureksky Municipal District as Mari-Turek Urban Settlement.

References

Notes

Sources

Urban-type settlements in the Mari El Republic
Urzhumsky Uyezd
